The Garo people, are a Tibeto-Burmese ethnic group inhabiting predominantly in Northeast Indian states of Meghalaya, Assam, Tripura and Nagaland, and in some neighbouring areas of Bangladesh, including Madhupur, Mymensingh,  Haluaghat, Dhobaura, Durgapur, Kolmakanda, Jamalpur, Sherpur, Jhinaigati,  Nalitabari, Gazini Hills Madhyanagar, Bakshiganj and Sribardi. Historically, the name Garo was used for wide range of inhabitant in southern bank of Brahmaputra but now refers to those who call themselves A•chik Mande (literally "hill people," from A•chik "bite soil" + mande "people") or simply A•chik or Mande  and the name "Garo" is now being used by outsiders as an exonym.They are the second-largest tribe in Meghalaya after the Khasi and comprise about a third of the local population.

Religion
Many of the Garo community follow Christianity, with some rural pockets practising traditional animist religion known as Songsarek. It is argued that the indigenous groups who settled in the Garo Hills brought their ancient animistic religious beliefs and practices, with deities who must be appeased with rituals, ceremonies and animal sacrifices to ensure the welfare of the tribe.

Rev Ramke W. Momin was the first devout Christian from among the Garo. Rev Ramke W. Momin was born in Goalpara, Assam, India, sometime in the 1820s.

Songsarek
The religion of the ancestors of the Garo is Songsarek. Their tradition "Dakbewal" relates to their most prominent cultural activities. In 2000, the group called "Risi Jilma" was founded to safeguard the ancient Garo Songsarek religion. Seeing the Songsarek population in decline, youth from the Dadenggiri subdivision of Garo Hills felt the need to preserve the Songsarek culture. The Rishi Jilma group is active in about 480 villages in and around Garo Hills.

Geographical distribution

The Garo are mainly distributed over the Garo Hills, Khasi Hills, Ri-Bhoi Districts in Meghalaya, Kamrup, Goalpara, Sivasagar, Karbi Anglong districts of Assam, Khasi Hills in Meghalaya and Dimapur (Nagaland State), lesser numbers (about 200,000) are found in Mymensingh (Jamalpur, Sherpur, Netrakona, Mymensingh) and capital Dhaka, Sylhet, and Moulovibazar districts of Bangladesh.

It is estimated that total Garo population in Meghalaya, Assam, Nagaland, Tripura, West Bengal, Canada, USA, Europe, Australia and Bangladesh together is more than 1 million.

Garo are also found scattered in the Indian state of Tripura. The recorded Garo population was around 6,000 in 1971.

Garo form minority groups in Cooch Behar, Jalpaiguri, Darjeeling and West Dinajpur of West Bengal, as well as in Nagaland. The present generation of Garo forming minority groups in these states of India that do not speak the ethnic language any longer.

Garo form small communities in different parts of the world including Canada, America, Australia, England.

Language

The Garo language belongs to the Tibeto-Burman language family. The brief lists of Garo words were compiled by East India Company officials in 1800, and Garo acquired a Latin-based spelling system during the late 19th century, devised by American Baptist missionaries and based on a northeastern dialect of Garo. The first translation of the Garo Bible was published in 1924. The modern official language in schools and government offices is English.

Historical accounts

According to one oral tradition, the Garo first migrated to the Garo Hills from Tibet (referred to as Tibotgre) around 400 BC under the leadership of Jappa Jalimpa, crossing the Brahmaputra River and tentatively settling in the river valley. The Garo finally settled down in Garo Hills (East-West Garo Hills), finding providence and security in this uncharted territory and claiming it as their own. Records of the tribe by expanding Mughal armies and by East India Company officials in what is now Bangladesh wrote of the brutality of the people.

The earliest written records about the Garo date from around 1800, and were written by officials of the East India Company. They "...were looked upon as bloodthirsty savages, who inhabited a tract of hills covered with almost impenetrable jungle, the climate of which was considered so deadly as to make it impossible for a white man to live there".

In December 1872, the British Raj dispatched a military expedition to Garo Hills to establish control over the region. The campaign was conducted from three sides – south, east, and west. The Garo warriors (matgriks) confronted them at the Battle of Rongrenggre equipped with spears, swords, and shields. They were defeated in the engagement, as the Garo did not have guns or mortars like the British Indian Army. By the early 1900s, the American Baptist Mission was active in the area, working from Tura, Meghalaya.

Two early histories of the Garo people were written by deputy commissioner for Eastern Bengal and Assam Major A. Playfair, The Garos (1909), and by Sinha T.C., The Psyche of Garos (1955).

Culture
The Garo are one of the few remaining matrilineal societies in the world. The individuals take their clan titles from their mothers. Traditionally, the youngest daughter (nokmechik) inherits the property from her mother. Sons leave their parents' house at puberty and are trained in the village bachelor dormitory (nokpante). After getting married, the man lives in his wife's house.

In Garo habitations, the house where unmarried male youth or bachelors live is called Nokpante. The women were forbidden from entering the Nokpante. Any woman who broke this rule was considered tainted or "marang nangjok." But this is not as common now. 

Garo is a matrilineal society but is not to be mistaken to be matriarchal. While the property is owned by women, the men govern the society and domestic affairs and manage the property.

The Garo people have traditional names. However, the culture of the modern Garo community has been greatly influenced by Christianity.

Ornaments: Both men and women enjoy adorning themselves with ornaments:
Nadongbi or sisa – made of a brass ring worn in the lobe of the ear
Nadirong – brass ring worn in the upper part of the ear
Natapsi – string of beads worn in the upper part of the ear
Jaksan – bangles of different materials and sizes
Ripok – necklaces made of long barrel-shaped beads of cornelian or red glass while some are made of brass or silver and are worn in special occasions
Jaksil – elbow ring worn by rich men on Gana ceremonies

The dresses of Meghalaya worn by the Garo tribe vary depending on the basis of the place of residence of the people. Women who belong to faraway villages of Garo hills wear an eking, a small cloth worn around the waist. 
Penta – small piece of ivory struck into the upper part of the ear projecting upwards parallel to the side of the head
Seng·ki – waistband consisting of several rows of conch-shells worn by women
Pilne – head ornament worn during dances only by women

Clothing: The traditional dress of the Garo Women's is Dakmanda, Dakshari. In keeping with the modern age, Garo women wear jeans, Sari, T-shirts, pajamas. Garo men wear jeans, T-shirts, shirts.

Weapons: Garo have their own weapons. One of the principal weapons is a two-edged sword called mil·am made of one piece of iron from hilt to point. There is a cross-bar between the hilt and the blade where a bunch of ox's tail-hair is attached. The other types of weapons are shield, spear, bow and arrow, axe, dagger, etc.

Food and drink: Their staple food is rice. Kochu (taro), millet, maize, and tapioca are important substitutes for rice when it is scarce. Other than rice, some of the most frequently consumed foods are kochu, dried fish, bamboo shoots, sorrell, sweet potato, pumpkin, gourd, and banana. Although they eat meat less often, they relish that of wild animals, beef, pork, chicken, and fish and other aquatic fauna.

They use a kind of potash in curries, which they obtain by burning dry pieces of plantain stems or young bamboo locally known as kalchi or katchi. After they are burnt, the ashes are collected and dipped in water; they are strained in conical shapes in a bamboo strainer. These days most of the townspeople use cooking soda from the market in place of ash water. The Garo make their own liquor by fermenting a special type of rice and the finished product is called "Minil Bichi". Besides other drinks, country liquor plays an important role in the life of the Garo.

Garo architecture
Generally one finds similar types of arts and architecture in Garo Hills. They normally use locally available building materials like timber, bamboo, cane, and thatch. Garo architecture can be classified into the following categories:
Nokmong – The house where every A'chik household can stay together. This house is built so that inside the house there are provisions for sleeping, hearth, sanitary arrangements, kitchen, water storage, place for fermenting wine, place for use as cattle-shed or for stall-feeding the cow, and the space between earthen floor and raised platform for use as pigsty and in the back of the house; the raised platform serves as hencoop for keeping fowl and for storing firewood, thus every need is fully provisioned for in one house.
Nokpante – In the Garo habitation, the house where unmarried male youth or bachelors live is called Nokpante. The word Nokpante means the house of bachelors. Nokpantes are generally constructed in the front courtyard of the Nokma, the chief. The art of cultivation, arts, and cultures, and games are taught in the Nokpante to the boys by the senior boys and elders.
Jamsireng – In certain areas, in the rice field or orchards, small huts are constructed. They are called Jamsireng or Jamdap. The season's fruits or grains are collected and stored in the Jamsireng, or it can be used for sleeping.
Jamadal – The small house, a type of miniature house, built in the jhum fields is called Jamadal or ‘field house’. In certain places, where there is danger from wild animals, a small house with ladder is constructed on the treetop. This is called Borang or ‘house on the treetop’.

Festivals

The common and regular festivals are those connected with agricultural operations.

Most Garo festivals are based on the agricultural cycle of crops. The harvesting festival Wangala is the biggest celebration of the tribe happening in the month of October or November every year. It is the thanksgiving after harvest in the honor of the god Saljong, provider of nature's bounties.

Other festivals include Gal·mak Goa, Agalmaka, etc.

Asanang Wangala 
There is a celebration of the 100-drum festival in Asanang near Tura in West Garo Hills, Meghalaya, India usually in October or November. Thousands of people, especially young people, gather at Asanang and celebrate Wangala. Garo girls known as nomil and boys pante take part in 'Wangala' festivals. The pantes beat a kind of long drum called dama in groups and play bamboo flute. The nomils with colorful costumes dance to the tune of dama and folk songs in a circle.

Dhaka Wangala
Garo in Dhaka celebrates wangala festival every year in November-December. There are 30,000 Garo in Dhaka Metropolitan city who are preserving the Garo Culture and tradition. In the Wangala day Garo arrive from every corner of the city in Lalmatia Housing Society ground to celebrate the festival. A total number of ten thousand people attend the celebration. Colorful rally with traditional dress, musical drums are played. The speeches from the guests are also one of the attraction for the people. The AMUA for Misi Saljon is take place by the original Kamal from village. The display stalls are arrange with traditional food, dresses, and other materials. There is also Souvenir publication from the Nokma Parishad where Prime Minister's Message is included. The Walgala festival in Dhaka bring special day for the Garo in Dhaka city.

Christmas
Though Christmas is a religious celebration, December is a great season of celebration in Garo Hills. In the first week of December, the town of Tura and all other smaller towns are illuminated with lights. This celebration featured by worship, dance, merry-making, grand feasts, and social visits goes on till 10 January. People from all religions and sections take part in the Christmas celebration. In December 2003 the tallest Christmas tree of the world was erected at Dobasipara, Tura by the Baptist boys of Dobasipara. Its height was 119.3 feet, covered by BBC and widely broadcast on television. The tree was decorated with 16,319 colored light bulbs; it took about 14 days to complete the decoration.

Ahaia Winter Festival
The annual festival, conceptualised in 2008, is aimed to promote and brand this part of the region as a popular tourist destination by giving an opportunity for the local people to showcase their skills and expertise. The three-day fest features a gala event with carnival, cultural show, food festival, rock concert, wine festival, angling competition, ethnic wear competition, children's fancy dress, DJ Nite, exhibitions, housie housie, and other games. The entry forms for carnival and other events are available at the Tourist Office, Tura.

Simsang Festival 
It was first started in 2006 in Williamnagar, Meghalaya. Simsang festival was known as Winter festival before and it promotes the talents of the local people. It also promotes the local bands and the exhibition on hand crafts made by local people. It also promotes the indigenous games of Garo.

Music and dance
Group songs may include Ku·dare sala, Hoa ring·a, Injoka, Kore doka, Ajea, Doroa, Nanggorere goserong, Dim dim chong dading chong, Serejing, Boel sala etc.

Dance forms are Ajema Roa, Mi Su·a, Chambil Moa, Do·kru Sua, Chame mikkang nia, Kambe Toa, Gaewang Roa, Napsepgrika and many others.

Traditional Garo musical instruments can broadly be classified into four groups.
 Idiophones: Self-sounding and made of resonant materials – Kakwa, Nanggilsi, Guridomik, Kamaljakmora, all kinds of gongs, Rangkilding, Rangbong, Nogri etc.
 Aerophone: Wind instruments, whose sound come from air vibrating inside a pipe when is blown – Adil, Singga, Sanai, Kal, Bolbijak, Illep or Illip, Olongna, Tarabeng, Imbanggi, Akok or Dakok, Bangsi rori, Tilara or Taragaku, Bangsi mande, Otekra, Wa·pepe or Wa·pek.
 Chordophone: Stringed instrument – Dotrong, Sarenda, Chigring or Bagring, Dimchrang or Kimjim, Gongmima or Goggins.
 Membranophone: With skins or membranes stretched over a frame – Am·being Dama, Chisak Dama, Atong Dama, Garaganching Dama, Ruga and Chibok Dama, Dual-Matchi Dama, Nagra, Kram etc.
 War Dance: War dance is danced before going to war and after returning victorious. At this time, all the men and women got up to drink and dance with joy.

Apart from traditional music and dances, Garos are now excelling in modern music creation. Garo community has popular modern music singers and music producers such as Ennio Marak, Enosh Sangma and many others.

Professions

The Garo rely on nature. Their profession is hunting and warrior known as Matgrik. They practice jhum cultivation which is the most common agricultural tradition. For more than 4,000 years, until modern times, the Garo have been practicing jhum cultivation. Since the middle of the twentieth century, most Garo work in private industry or have government jobs. There is coal mining in the area, as well as the cultivation of bananas and other fruits.

Notable Garo people

Indians
 Martin Danggo, politician, Indian National Congress, National People's Party, Bharatiya Janat Party, India
 Kilco Marak, right-handed pace bowlers, Meghalaya cricket team, Meghalaya, India
 S. C. Marak, former Chief Minister, Meghalaya.
 Sanford Marak, former MP, Tura -ST Constituency, fifteenth Lok Sabha Election, India
 Numal Momin, MLA, the Assam Legislative Assembly, Chairperson of Assam Urban Water Supply and Sewerage Board
 Ramke W. Momin, educationist and Philosopher. 
 Agatha Sangma, former Union Minister, Govt of India.
 Captain Williamson A. Sangma, founder Chief Minister Of Meghalaya, First Governor amongst tribals.
 Chengkam Sangma, right-handed pace bowler, Meghalaya cricket team
 Conrad Sangma, 12th Chief Minister of Meghalaya, Politician, National People's Party and Nationalist Congress Party
 Dippu Sangma, all-rounders, vice-captain, Meghalaya cricket team, Meghalaya, India
 Gilbertson Sangma, Indian international footballer
 James Sangma, minister of Home, Law, Power, District Council Affairs, Food Civil Supplies & Consumer Affairs, Government of Meghalaya
 Mukul Sangma, former Chief Minister, Meghalaya.
 P. A. Sangma, former Lok Sabha Speaker, Govt. of India.
 Pa Togan Sangma, freedom fighter
 Tengchan Sangma, right-handed batsmen, Meghalaya cricket team, Meghalaya, India
 Timothy Shira, deputy speaker, NPP since 21 March 2018

Bangladeshi
 Jewel Areng, member of Parliament of Bangladesh.
 Maria Manda, Bangladeshi women's national team footballer
 Promode Mankin, former minister, Govt. of Bangladesh.
 Sheuli Azim, Bangladeshi football player (Muslim-Garo)

References

Notes

Bibliography

"Two new Mymensingh MPs take oath". The Independent. Retrieved 14 February 2018.
"Awami League's Jewel Areng, Nazim Uddin win Mymensingh constituencies in by-elections". bdnews24.com. Retrieved 14 February 2018.
"Mymensingh, a tribal Catholic elected to Parliament". asianews.it. Retrieved 14 February 2018.
"AL nominates Jewel, Nazim for M'singh by-polls". banglanews24.com. Retrieved 14 February 2018.
Indigenous Literature: Building a bridge between cultures, thedailystar.net>city.
Times (2016-11-01). "Garo Icon Ramke W Momin's grave to be memorialized". Meghalaya Times. Retrieved 2019-10-14.
Sangma, MS (15 October 2019). "Ramke W Momin A search for truth" (PDF). NEHU.
 "Congress outsmarted in Meghalaya, Conrad Sangma to be sworn in March 6". The Hindu. 4 March 2018. Archived from the original on 4 March 2018. Retrieved 5 March 2018.

External links

 Official site of Meghalaya State of India
 A Garo, Mande Adivasi: Dance Performance Art in Bangladesh
 East Garo Hills District: The people
 West Garo Hills District official website: The people - Garos
 South Garo Hills District official website -  People and Culture 
 Ethnologue entry for Garo
  http://westgarohills.gov.in/culture.html
 Still The Children Are Here (brief documentary of a Garo neighbourhood in Sadolpara, interior Garo Hills)

Ethnic groups in Northeast India
Bodo-Kachari
Headhunting
Tribes of Meghalaya
Scheduled Tribes of Meghalaya
Scheduled Tribes of Assam
Scheduled Tribes of Mizoram
Scheduled Tribes of Nagaland
Ethnic groups in Bangladesh
Ethnic groups in South Asia